The 2017 Texas Bowl was an American college football bowl game played on December 27, 2017, at NRG Stadium in Houston, Texas. Sponsored by the Academy Sports + Outdoors sporting goods company, it was officially known as the Academy Sports + Outdoors Texas Bowl.  The game was one of the 2017–18 bowl games concluding the 2017 FBS football season.

The twelfth edition of the Texas Bowl, the game featured the Texas Longhorns of the Big 12 Conference against the Missouri Tigers of the Southeastern Conference.  This was the teams' 24th meeting.  Prior to the game, Texas led the series 17–6.  This was their first match-up since Missouri left the Big 12 Conference after the 2011 season. Texas defeated Missouri, .

Teams

Texas Longhorns

Missouri Tigers

Game summary

Scoring summary

Statistics

References

External links
 Game summary at ESPN

Texas Bowl
Texas Bowl
Missouri Tigers football bowl games
Texas Longhorns football bowl games
Texas Bowl
Texas Bowl
Texas Bowl